The Williams International J400 is a small turbojet engine developed by Williams Research to power target drones.

Design
The J400 is a single-shaft, centrifugal/centrifugal-axial flow turbojet engine. There are two versions of the J400, the WR2 which yields 125 lbs. of thrust, and the more powerful WR24, which yields 190-240 pounds of thrust.

Applications
 BQM-74 Chukar
 Canadair CL-89

See also

References 

1960s turbojet engines
J400